After the political scandal one year prior, no national flags were used at the ninth edition of the ninth annual Four Hills Tournament in Germany and Austria, only those of the host country and the hosting ski club.

East German athlete Helmut Recknagel won the tournament for a record third time after his absence the previous year.

Participating nations and athletes

With the return of the East block nations, the 1960-61 tournament saw a record number of 12 participating nations.

Results

Oberstdorf
 Schattenbergschanze, Oberstdorf
30 December 1960

Garmisch-Partenkirchen
 Große Olympiaschanze, Garmisch-Partenkirchen
01 January 1961

Innsbruck
 Bergiselschanze, Innsbruck
06 January 1961

Bischofshofen
 Paul-Ausserleitner-Schanze, Bischofshofen
08 January 1961

In the overall lead already, Helmut Recknagel won the Bischofshofen event and thus the tournament.

Final ranking

References

External links
 FIS website
 Four Hills Tournament web site

Four Hills Tournament
1960 in ski jumping
1961 in ski jumping